Ulla-Britt ("Lena") Brogren (18 April 1929 in Västerås – 21 September 2005 (aged 76) in Gothenburg) was a Swedish actress.

In the 1950s, Brogren started working at Gothenburg City Theatre, where she was one of the names on the posters. Her appearances in the plays Lång dags färd mot natt and Kaos är granne med Gud were well known. In the play Tjena Gary, she acted against Ingvar Hirdwall. Hagge Geigert made her engaged for playing the "bad" children's book author Mrs Smythe in the play En man för mycket at Liseberg Theatre in 1992.

Selected filmography 
1952 – Secrets of Women
1957 – Lille Fridolf blir morfar
1973 – Om 7 flickor
1976 – Hem till byn (TV)
1978 – Hedebyborna (TV)
1981 – Tuppen
1981 – Rasmus på luffen
1981 – Operation Leo
1982 – Polisen som vägrade svara (TV)
1994 – Rena rama Rolf (TV)
1998 – Svenska hjärtan (TV)
2003 – Solbacken: Avd. E (TV)
2005 – Saltön (TV)

External links 

Swedish television actresses
2005 deaths
1929 births
People from Västerås
Swedish stage actresses